Line 6 of the Tianjin Metro is a rapid transit line running semi-circular from north-east to south-east Tianjin. It was opened on 6 August 2016. The line was later extended on 31 December 2016 and on 26 April 2018. The line is currently 42.6 km long and has 38 stations. The line currently uses 6 car B size trains but the platform is long enough to support 8 car trains as demand grows in the future. Line 6, together with Line 5 will form a loop around Tianjin.

Opening timeline

Stations (northeast to southeast)

References

Tianjin Metro lines
Railway lines opened in 2016
2016 establishments in China